Belzile is a surname. Notable people with the surname include:

Alex Belzile (born 1991), Canadian ice hockey player
Alfred Belzile (1907–1994), Canadian politician and farmer
Charles H. Belzile (born 1933), Canadian Army general
Germain Belzile (1957–2021), Canadian economist
Gleason Belzile (1898–1950), Canadian politician